Renee Godfrey (born Renee Vera Haal; September 1, 1919 – May 24, 1964) was an American stage and motion picture actress and singer.

Early life
Godfrey was born September 1, 1919, in New York, with Dutch and French ancestry as the daughter of Emil Haall, a Dutch diamond merchant, and his wife.

Career
Beginning at age 11, she worked as a model, and as a sophomore in high school she switched to night classes so that she could model during the day. She posed for artist John La Gatta and photographers Edward Steichen, Victor Keppler, John Hutchins, and others. She appeared in advertisements that were published nationally, and she had the most-photographed hands and legs in New York. When a film executive saw her image on a billboard, that led the way to her work in motion pictures.

Godfrey was featured on both radio and television programs in Britain. She initially entered films at RKO, working as Renee Haal, and made her début in Sam Wood's Kitty Foyle (1940). Also in 1940, she was selected by RKO as that studio's actress most likely to succeed in a film career.

Her next movie, Unexpected Uncle (1941), was directed by Peter Godfrey, who also directed her in the romantic thriller Highways by Night in 1942. Her work in Unexpected Uncle resulted in her signing a long-term contract with RKO early in 1942. She began working as Renee Godfrey in Up in Arms (1944).

During World War II, she and her husband entertained troops with amateur magic shows that they put on through the USO. She continued working in small roles, such as Vivian Vedder in Terror by Night (1946), in which she sported a particularly unconvincing English accent, and Mrs. Stebbins in Stanley Kramer's Inherit the Wind. She worked into the 1960s, appearing in Can-Can and Tender Is the Night.

For the most part, however, Godfrey was out of view. Her director-husband, who had flourished on 50s TV, was in ill health by the end of the decade. Taking secretarial and real estate classes to help support the family income, Godfrey tried making a comeback of sorts, finding bit roles in the films. She was also a guest player on such shows as Perry Mason, Hazel, The Donna Reed Show and Wagon Train.

Personal life
In 1938, she went to London for a singing engagement and met the actor/director/screenwriter Peter Godfrey, whom she married on August 6, 1941. He was almost 20 years her senior. With primary focus on raising her three children (which included a set of twins), she was seen only sporadically on TV during the 1950s with guest roles on programs hosted by Loretta Young and Jane Wyman.

Death
She died in Los Angeles, California, on 24 May 1964 from the effects of cancer. She was 44 years old. Her final performance in the film, Those Calloways was released posthumously. Her body was buried at Glendale's Forest Lawn Memorial Park Cemetery.

Filmography

Films roles
 Kitty Foyle (1940) - Shopgirl in Elevator (uncredited)
 Let's Make Music (1941) - Helen, Chorus Girl (uncredited)
 Citizen Kane (1941) - Nurse (uncredited)
 Hurry, Charlie, Hurry (1941) - Josephine Whitley (as Renee Haal)
 Unexpected Uncle (1941) - Carol West (as Renee Haal)
 Wedded Blitz (1942) - (as Renee Haal)
 Framing Father (1942) - Mary Adams (as Renee Haal)
 Highways by Night (1942) - Ellen Cromwell
 Up in Arms (1944) - Goldwyn Girl (uncredited)
 Bedside Manner (1945) - Stella Livingston
 Terror by Night (1946) - Vivian Vedder
 Winter Wonderland (1947) - Phyllis Simpson
 Down Missouri Way (1946) - Gloria Baxter
 French Leave (1948) - Mimi
 The Decision of Christopher Blake (1948) - Sheila, Actress in Play (uncredited)
 Can-Can (1960) - Dowager (uncredited)
 Inherit the Wind (1960) - Mrs. Stebbins
 Tender Is the Night (1962) - Nurse (uncredited)
 Those Calloways (1965) - Sarah Mellott (uncredited) (final film role)

Television roles
 Duffy's Tavern (1 episode, 1954) - Renee
 Dr. Hudson's Secret Journal (1 episode, 1955) - Nurse
 The Star and the Story (1 episode, 1956) - Miss Harrington
 Buffalo Bill, Jr. (2 episodes, 1956) - Linda Abbott
 Letter to Loretta (1 episode, 1956) - Andree Chartaud
 Jane Wyman Presents The Fireside Theatre (2 episodes, 1957) - Dorothy / Mrs. Dioso
 Zane Grey Theater (2 episodes, 1960) - Alicia
 The Ann Sothern Show (1 episode, 1961) - Martha Newton
 Frontier Circus (1 episode, 1962) - Stella
 Hazel (1 episode, 1962) - Miss Lewis
 The Donna Reed Show (1 episode, 1962) - Gloria
 Perry Mason (2 episodes, 1960–1962) - Lady Librarian / Miss Winslow
 General Electric Theater (1 episode, 1962) - Ethel
 The Alfred Hitchcock Hour (1 episode, 1962) - Hartman's Secretary

References

External links

 
 Renee Godfrey at weblo.com
 Biography at New York Times online

1919 births
1964 deaths
Deaths from cancer in California
Actresses from New York (state)
Singers from New York (state)
American stage actresses
American television actresses
American film actresses
20th-century American actresses
20th-century American singers
20th-century American women singers
Burials at Forest Lawn Memorial Park (Glendale)